Zvi Guershoni (born 1915, died 1 September 1976) was an Israeli politician who served as a member of the Knesset for the Alignment between 1969 and his death in 1976.

Biography
Born in Bălți in the Beletsky Uyezd of the Bessarabia Governorate of the Russian Empire (today in Moldova), Guershoni attended a Hebrew gymnasium. He was a Maccabi HaTzair member before joining Gordonia. He became a member of the Gordonia leadership in Romania, and was also a member of the central committee of the Romanian branch of HeHalutz.

In 1936 he made aliyah to Mandatory Palestine, where he initially worked in orchards in Rehovot. Between 1937 and 1940 he worked in the Port of Haifa, before being amongst the founders of kibbutz Nir Am in 1943. Between 1946 and 1947 he travelled to Holocaust survivor camps in Europe.

During the 1948 Arab-Israeli War he served as secretary of the Negev Settlements Committee, and was later a member of Mapai-affiliated Ihud HaKvutzot VeHaKibbutzim movement, serving as its secretary of internal affairs. He also studied economics at the Hebrew University of Jerusalem.

In 1969 he was elected to the Knesset on the Alignment list. He was re-elected in 1973, but died in office on 1 September 1976. His seat was taken by Senetta Yoseftal.

References

External links
 

1915 births
1976 deaths
People from Bălți
People from Beletsky Uyezd
Moldovan Jews
Bessarabian Jews
Romanian emigrants to Mandatory Palestine
Jews in Mandatory Palestine
Israeli people of Moldovan-Jewish descent
Alignment (Israel) politicians
Members of the 7th Knesset (1969–1974)
Members of the 8th Knesset (1974–1977)
Hebrew University of Jerusalem Faculty of Social Sciences alumni